Elachista occulta is a moth of the family Elachistidae. It is found from southern France to Greece.

The larvae feed on Festuca acuminata and Festuca cinerea. They mine the leaves of their host plant.

References

occulta
Moths described in 1978
Moths of Europe